Drešaj is a village in the municipality of Tuzi, Montenegro.

Demographics
According to the 2011 census, its population was 176, all but three of them  Albanians.

References

Populated places in Tuzi Municipality
Albanian communities in Montenegro